Tephrosia rosea, commonly known as Flinders River poison, is a plant species, endemic to northern Australia. It is a shrub with an erect or sprawling habit, growing to between 0.2 and 2 metres high. Pink to purple flowers are produced throughout the year in the species' native range.

The species was first formally described by Victorian Government Botanist Ferdinand von Mueller in 1864 in Flora Australiensis, from a collection at Montague Sound.

Varieties include: 
Tephrosia rosea var. clementii Domin 
Tephrosia rosea var. glabrior Pedley ms 
Tephrosia rosea Benth. var. rosea 
Tephrosia rosea var. venulosa Pedley ms

References

rosea
Flora of the Northern Territory
Flora of Queensland
Fabales of Australia
Rosids of Western Australia
Taxa named by George Bentham
Taxa named by Ferdinand von Mueller
Plants described in 1864